The FIS Ski Flying World Championships 2010 was held 18–21 March 2010 in Planica, Slovenia for a record sixth time. Planica hosted the event previously in 1972, 1979, 1985, 1994, and 2004. Austria's Gregor Schlierenzauer was the defending individual champion. Schlierenzauer and his Austrian teammates of Andreas Kofler, Martin Koch, and Thomas Morgenstern were the defending team champions.

Schedule

Results

Qualifying
18 March 2010

Individual

Ammann had the longest jump of the competition with a 236.5 m fourth round jump. He also led after the first two rounds and had the most points both two days to win the championships for the first time. Adam Małysz was second after three jumps, but had a poor fourth round jump to fall to fourth. The defending champion Schlierenzauer finished second. The second longest jump had Antonín Hájek with a 236.0 m and local matador Robert Kranjec, the winner of the ski flying World Cup 2009/10, finished fifth. After the first round, former ski flying champion Roar Ljøkelsøy jumped for the final time in his career after he failed to qualify for the first round.

19–20 March 2010.

Team Event

21 March 2010.

Schlierenzauer had the longest jump of the competition with his 231.0 m final round jump.

Medal table

References

External links
Official website  - accessed 11 November 2009.
FIS Ski Flying World Championship 2010 - calendar - accessed 11 November 2009.

2010 in ski jumping
2010 in Slovenian sport
FIS Ski Flying World Championships
Articles containing video clips
Ski jumping competitions in Slovenia
International sports competitions hosted by Slovenia
March 2010 sports events in Europe